This list of Australian Aboriginal group names includes names and collective designations which have been applied, either currently or in the past, to groups of Aboriginal Australians. The list does not include Torres Strait Islander peoples, who are ethnically, culturally and linguistically distinct from Australian Aboriginal peoples, although also an Indigenous Australian people.

Typically, Aboriginal Australian mobs are differentiated by language groups. Most Aboriginal people could name a number of groups of which they are members, each group being defined in terms of different criteria and often with much overlap. Many of the names listed below are properly understood as language or dialect names; some are simply the word meaning man or person in the associated language; some are endonyms (the name as used by the people themselves) and some exonyms (names used by one group for another, and not by that group itself), while others are demonyms (terms for people from specific geographical areas).

List

See also

Australian frontier wars
Indigenous peoples of Australia
Languages confirmed by AIATSIS

Notes

 This name is one of the names used on the widely used Aboriginal Australia Map, David Horton (ed.), 1994 published in The Encyclopedia of Aboriginal Australia by AIATSIS. Early versions of the map also divided Australia into 18 regions (Southwest, Northwest, Desert, Kimberley, Fitzmaurice, North, Arnhem, Gulf, West Cape, Torres Strait, East, Rainforest, Northeast, Eyre, Riverine, Southeast, Spencer and Tasmania); the region of the tribes which are depicted in this map are shown in the last column of this table.
 This name is the main name used in Norman Tindale's Catalogue of Australian Aboriginal Tribes. Each has a separate article under the name listed there, and alternative names are also listed. In most cases (but not all) the name in the left column "Group name" is also the main name used by Tindale.

Citations

Sources

External links
 Aboriginal Culture
  − List of the 716 Individual Tribal Groups identified throughout Australia... reproduced with permission, George William (Buralnyarla) Helon's Aboriginal Australia: Register of Tribe, Clan, Horde, Linguistic Group, Language Names and AIATSIS Language Codes - Including Synonyms, Misnomers and Approximate Locations (1998) 
 AustLang database of Australian languages
 Ausanthrop.net (tribal names and sub-groups)
 Norman B. Tindale's Tribal map
 AIATSIS map showing the locations of the various groups
 Aboriginal and Torres Strait Islander Social Justice Commissioner
 Social Justice Reports 1994-2009
 Native Title Reports 1994-2009

 
Group names